Inferences are steps in reasoning, moving from premises to logical consequences; etymologically, the word infer means to "carry forward". Inference is theoretically traditionally divided into deduction and induction, a distinction that in Europe dates at least to Aristotle (300s BCE). Deduction is inference deriving logical conclusions from premises known or assumed to be true,  with the laws of valid inference being studied in logic.  Induction is inference from particular evidence to a universal conclusion. A third type of inference is sometimes distinguished, notably by Charles Sanders Peirce, contradistinguishing abduction from induction.

Various fields study how inference is done in practice. Human inference (i.e. how humans draw conclusions) is traditionally studied within the fields of logic, argumentation studies, and cognitive psychology; artificial intelligence researchers develop automated inference systems to emulate human inference. Statistical inference uses mathematics to draw conclusions in the presence of uncertainty. This generalizes deterministic reasoning, with the absence of uncertainty as a special case. Statistical inference uses quantitative or qualitative (categorical) data which may be subject to random variations.

Definition
The process by which a conclusion is inferred from multiple observations is called inductive reasoning.  The conclusion may be correct or incorrect, or correct to within a certain degree of accuracy, or correct in certain situations.  Conclusions inferred from multiple observations may be tested by additional observations.

This definition is disputable (due to its lack of clarity. Ref: Oxford English dictionary: "induction ... 3. Logic the inference of a general law from particular instances." ) The definition given thus applies only when the "conclusion" is general.

Two possible definitions of "inference" are:
 A conclusion reached on the basis of evidence and reasoning.
 The process of reaching such a conclusion.

Examples

Example for definition #1
Ancient Greek philosophers defined a number of syllogisms, correct three part inferences, that can be used as building blocks for more complex reasoning. We begin with a famous example:
 All humans are mortal.
 All Greeks are humans.
 All Greeks are mortal.

The reader can check that the premises and conclusion are true, but logic is concerned with inference: does the truth of the conclusion follow from that of the premises?

The validity of an inference depends on the form of the inference. That is, the word "valid" does not refer to the truth of the premises or the conclusion, but rather to the form of the inference.  An inference can be valid even if the parts are false, and can be invalid even if some parts are true.  But a valid form with true premises will always have a true conclusion.

For example, consider the form of the following symbological track:
All meat comes from animals.
All beef is meat.
Therefore, all beef comes from animals.

If the premises are true, then the conclusion is necessarily true, too.

Now we turn to an invalid form.
All A are B.
All C are B.
Therefore, all C are A.

To show that this form is invalid, we demonstrate how it can lead from true premises to a false conclusion.
All apples are fruit. (True)
All bananas are fruit. (True)
Therefore, all bananas are apples. (False)

A valid argument with a false premise may lead to a false conclusion, (this and the following examples do not follow the Greek syllogism):
All tall people are French. (False)
John Lennon was tall. (True)
Therefore, John Lennon was French. (False)

When a valid argument is used to derive a false conclusion from a false premise, the inference is valid because it follows the form of a correct inference.

A valid argument can also be used to derive a true conclusion from a false premise:
All tall people are musicians. (Valid, False)
John Lennon was tall. (Valid, True)
Therefore, John Lennon was a musician. (Valid, True)

In this case we have one false premise and one true premise where a true conclusion has been inferred.

Example for definition #2

Evidence:  It is the early 1950s and you are an American stationed in the Soviet Union.  You read in the Moscow newspaper that a soccer team from a small city in Siberia starts winning game after game.  The team even defeats the Moscow team.  Inference: The small city in Siberia is not a small city anymore.  The Soviets are working on their own nuclear or high-value secret weapons program.

Knowns: The Soviet Union is a command economy: people and material are told where to go and what to do.  The small city was remote and historically had never distinguished itself; its soccer season was typically short because of the weather.

Explanation:  In a command economy, people and material are moved where they are needed.  Large cities might field good teams due to the greater availability of high quality players; and teams that can practice longer (weather, facilities) can reasonably be expected to be better.  In addition, you put your best and brightest in places where they can do the most good—such as on high-value weapons programs.  It is an anomaly for a small city to field such a good team.  The anomaly (i.e. the soccer scores and great soccer team) indirectly described a condition by which the observer inferred a new meaningful pattern—that the small city was no longer small.  Why would you put a large city of your best and brightest in the middle of nowhere?  To hide them, of course.

Incorrect inference
An incorrect inference is known as a fallacy. Philosophers who study informal logic have compiled large lists of them, and cognitive psychologists have documented many biases in human reasoning that favor incorrect reasoning.

Applications

Inference engines

AI systems first provided automated logical inference and these were once extremely popular research topics, leading to industrial applications under the form of expert systems and later business rule engines.  More recent work on automated theorem proving has had a stronger
basis in formal logic.

An inference system's job is to extend a knowledge base automatically. The knowledge base (KB) is a set of propositions that represent what the system knows about the world. Several techniques can be used by that system to extend KB by means of valid inferences. An additional requirement is that the conclusions the system arrives at are relevant to its task.

Prolog engine
Prolog (for "Programming in Logic") is a programming language based on a subset of predicate calculus. Its main job is to check whether a certain proposition can be inferred from a KB (knowledge base) using an algorithm called backward chaining.

Let us return to our Socrates syllogism. We enter into our Knowledge Base the following piece of code:

 mortal(X) :- 	man(X).
 man(socrates). 
( Here :- can be read as "if".  Generally, if P  Q (if P then Q)  then in Prolog we would code Q:-P (Q if P).)
This states that all men are mortal and that Socrates is a man. Now we can ask the Prolog system about Socrates:

 ?- mortal(socrates).
(where ?- signifies a query: Can mortal(socrates). be deduced from the KB using the rules)
gives the answer "Yes".

On the other hand, asking the Prolog system the following:

 ?- mortal(plato).

gives the answer "No".

This is because Prolog does not know anything about Plato, and hence defaults to any property about Plato being false (the so-called closed world assumption). Finally
?- mortal(X) (Is anything mortal) would result in "Yes" (and in some implementations: "Yes": X=socrates)
Prolog can be used for vastly more complicated inference tasks. See the corresponding article for further examples.

Semantic web
Recently automatic reasoners found in semantic web a new field of application. Being based upon description logic, knowledge expressed using one variant of OWL can be logically processed, i.e., inferences can be made upon it.

Bayesian statistics and probability logic

Philosophers and scientists who follow the Bayesian framework for inference use the mathematical rules of probability to find this best explanation. The Bayesian view has a number of desirable features—one of them is that it embeds deductive (certain) logic as a subset (this prompts some writers to call Bayesian probability "probability logic", following E. T. Jaynes).

Bayesians identify probabilities with degrees of beliefs, with certainly true propositions having probability 1, and certainly false propositions having probability 0. To say that "it's going to rain tomorrow" has a 0.9 probability is to say that you consider the possibility of rain tomorrow as extremely likely.

Through the rules of probability, the probability of a conclusion and of alternatives can be calculated. The best explanation is most often identified with the most probable (see Bayesian decision theory). A central rule of Bayesian inference is Bayes' theorem.

Fuzzy logic

Non-monotonic logic 

A relation of inference is monotonic if the addition of premises does not undermine previously reached conclusions; otherwise the relation is non-monotonic.
Deductive inference is monotonic: if a conclusion is reached on the basis of a certain set of premises, then that conclusion still holds if more premises are added.

By contrast, everyday reasoning is mostly non-monotonic because it involves risk: we jump to conclusions from deductively insufficient premises.
We know when it is worth or even necessary (e.g. in medical diagnosis) to take the risk. Yet we are also aware that such inference is defeasible—that new information may undermine old conclusions. Various kinds of defeasible but remarkably successful inference have traditionally captured the attention of philosophers (theories of induction, Peirce's theory of abduction, inference to the best explanation, etc.). More recently logicians have begun to approach the phenomenon from a formal point of view. The result is a large body of theories at the interface of philosophy, logic and artificial intelligence.

See also

 A priori and a posteriori
 Abductive reasoning
 Deductive reasoning
 Inductive reasoning
 Entailment
 Epilogism
 Analogy
 Axiom system
 Axiom
 Immediate inference
 Inferential programming
 Inquiry
 Logic
 Logic of information
 Logical assertion
 Logical graph
 Rule of inference
 List of rules of inference
 Theorem
 Transduction (machine learning)

References

Further reading

 
 
 
 
 

Inductive inference:
 
 
 
 
 
 
 

Abductive inference:
 
 
 

Psychological investigations about human reasoning:
 deductive:

 statistical:

,
 analogical:

 spatial:

 moral:

External links 

 
 Inference example and definition
 

 
Concepts in epistemology
Concepts in logic
Concepts in metaphilosophy
Concepts in metaphysics
Concepts in the philosophy of mind
History of logic
Intellectual history
Logic
Logic and statistics
Logical consequence
Metaphysics of mind
Reasoning
Sources of knowledge
Thought